Yoonj Kim is an American journalist, television correspondent, and writer. She is a correspondent at MTV and was a correspondent and producer at Playboy, where she hosted the documentary show Journalista.  She was also a former on-air talent and producer for the TPL Disrupt documentary series on Participant Media's Pivot.

Career 
At Playboy, Kim was a founding talent and producer of its documentary and news video division. She covered stories on drug policy and subcultures for her show Journalista.

Previously she reported and produced for Vocativ and has appeared in its segments for msnbc. Topics covered include marijuana legislation and female incarceration. She hosted Participant Media's hour-long documentary special on the open defecation crisis in New Delhi, India. As a writer, Kim was a columnist for Bitch, writing on the intersection of race and the entertainment industry based on her personal experiences as a former model.

Personal life  
Kim got her start in the television industry when veteran television producer Mitch Koss read an article she wrote for Slate. Koss, who previously mentored Anderson Cooper and Lisa Ling, recruited her to develop and host documentary programming for television.

References

American journalists
American writers
Playboy